Acanthocobitis (Paracanthocobitis) abutwebi also known as the hillstream zipper loach is a species of ray-finned fish in the genus, or subgenus, Paracanthocobitis. This species is known from the Karnaphuli, Meghna, and lower Brahmaputra and Ganges river drainages of Bangladesh.

References

abutwebi
Fish described in 2015
Taxa named by Randal Anthony Singer
Taxa named by Lawrence M. Page